I27 may refer to:
 Interstate 27, an Interstate Highway entirely in the U.S. state of Texas
 , a submarine of the Imperial Japanese Navy which saw service during the Pacific Campaign of World War II
 Gotland Infantry Regiment